Eckerman may refer to:

 Charlotte Eckerman (1759–1790), Swedish opera singer and actress
 Dan-Ola Eckerman (1963–1994), Finnish footballer
 Haley Eckerman (born 1992), American volleyball player
 Julie Eckerman (1765–1800), Swedish courtesan and spy
 Eckerman, Michigan